Styposis flavescens is a species of comb-footed spider in the family Theridiidae. It is found in Nicaragua to Venezuela.

References

Theridiidae
Spiders described in 1894
Spiders of Central America
Spiders of South America